The American Legion Post No. 560, in Long Beach, California, is one of 114 City of Long Beach's historic landmarks.  Constructed in the 1920s, the building was designated as a historic landmark as the last remaining American Legion post in Long Beach, and due to its association with notable persons in Long Beach history, including the Houghton family, Carl Peterson, Eddie Rickenbacher, and Harry Truman.

This post number, 560,  is now in Houston Texas

References

Buildings and structures in Long Beach, California
American Legion buildings
Clubhouses in California
Landmarks in Long Beach, California